Saline was a short-lived commune in the department of Calvados, northwestern France. The municipality was established on 1 January 2017 by merger of the former communes of Troarn (the seat) and Sannerville. This merger was revoked by the administrative court, and on 31 December 2019 the former communes Troarn and Sannerville were recreated.

See also 
Communes of the Calvados department

References 

Former communes of Calvados (department)